This page lists the city flags in Europe. It is a part of the Lists of city flags, which is split into continents due to its size.

Northern Europe

Denmark

Finland

Iceland

Norway

Historical

Sweden

Western Europe

Andorra

Austria

Belgium

France

Germany

Ireland

Liechtenstein

Luxembourg

Netherlands

Portugal

Municipalities

Cities and civil parishes (which do not exist as municipalities)

Monaco

Spain

Switzerland

United Kingdom

Southern Europe

Albania

Bosnia and Herzegovina

Bulgaria

Croatia

Greece

Italy

Kosovo

Malta

Historical

Montenegro

North Macedonia

Municipalities

Cities

Romania

San Marino

Serbia

Historical

Slovenia

City Municipalities

Municipalities

Turkey

Vatican City

Eastern Europe

Abkhazia

Armenia

Azerbaijan

Belarus

Cyprus

Czech Republic

Estonia

Municipalities

Cities and towns

Georgia

South Ossetia

Hungary

Latvia

Historical

Lithuania

Historical

Moldova

Transnistria

Poland

Russia

Slovakia

Ukraine

See also
 List of city flags in Africa
 List of city flags in Asia
 List of city flags in North America
 List of city flags in Oceania
 List of city flags in South America

Notes

References

External links
 Clickable map of Europe by Flags of the World.